Marguerite-Anne-Rose Delorme  (10 September 1876 - 26 July 1946) was a French painter known for her Orientalist and genre paintings.

Biography
Delorme was born on September 10, 1876 in Lunéville, France into an upper middle class family. Her father, Edmond Delorme, was  a military doctor and would later found the museum of Lunéville.

She showed an early interest in art. Her early paintings depicted themes of the family environment. She also found inspirations in Brittany where she spent the summer with the Merson family.

She studied under Raphaël Collin, Paul Leroy and Luc-Olivier Merson in their private workshops, but was unable to enter the Ecole de Beaux Artes which at the time did not accept female artists. In 1897, Delorme became a member of the Sociétaire des Artistes Français where she exhibited her paintings, winning Honorable Mention in 1897 and Medal of Third Class in 1901.

In 1905, she won a scholarship which allowed her to travel to Italy. This trip introduced her to different light conditions which had an influence on her style. During the first world war, Delorme began painting the Senegalese riflemen encountered in the "wintering camps". These works were presented in 1921 and she won the Compagnie Générale Transatlantique Prize. Following this, she found inspiration in North African themes by travelling Morocco, where she journeyed around the entire country painting scenes of everyday life.

Delorme died July 26, 1946 in Lille, France. Her work has been in the public domain since January 1, 2017.

Legacy
In 2013 the Musée du château des Lumières held a retrospective of Delorme's work.

Gallery

See also
 List of Orientalist artists
 Orientalism

References

External links

Further reading
Marguerite Delorme, 1876-1946: vers les lumières du Sud by Astrid Mallick, Thérèse-Françoise Crassous, Aziza Doudou 

1876 births
1946 deaths
People from Lunéville
19th-century French painters
20th-century French painters
French women painters
Orientalist painters
20th-century French women artists
19th-century French women artists